Eduard Hašek (15 December 1893 – 25 October 1960) was a Czechoslovak track and field athlete who competed in the 1920 Summer Olympics. In 1920 he was eliminated in the first round of the 100 metres competition. He also participated in the decathlon event but quit competitions after the fifth contest.

References

External links
Eduard Hašek. Sports Reference. Retrieved on 2015-02-01.
list of Czech athletes

1893 births
1960 deaths
Czechoslovak decathletes
Czechoslovak male sprinters
Olympic athletes of Czechoslovakia
Athletes (track and field) at the 1920 Summer Olympics
Place of birth missing
Olympic decathletes